Newhaven College is a non-denominational, independent school situated on Phillip Island, in Victoria, Australia. Newhaven College is located at 1770 Phillip Island Road, Phillip Island. The school opened its doors in 1980 at the 'Boys Home Road' Newhaven Campus and completed the move to the 82-acre campus on Phillip Island Road, Rhyll in December 2017. The school's vision is: 'Newhaven College supports the pursuit of personal excellence and encourages personal best through social, emotional, intellectual and spiritual growth'.

The College welcomes students from Prep to Year 12, with over 900 students enrolled in 2022. Principal Tony Corr leads the school, alongside Jason Scott (Head of Senior School and Vice Principal), Geoff White (Head of Middle School) and Ralph Arceo (Head of Junior School). In 1999, the Junior School opened at the Newhaven Campus with the introduction of a combined class of Year 5 and Year 6. The Year 9 Learning Centre opened in 2005. The Prep-Year 6 classes relocated to the Phillip Island Road Campus in 2011 followed by Years 7 and 8 in 2014. Finally, the Year 10-12 classes commenced at the new campus in 2018.

The school has four Houses: McHaffie, Sambell, Bass and Clarke.

Newhaven College is a member of the South Eastern Independent Schools Association (SEISA) and of the Victorian Ecumenical System of Schools (VESS).

Scholarships
Each year Newhaven College offers scholarships to students in the following categories: academic, sport, performing arts, leadership and community involvement. Awarded to Year 7-12 students who are able to demonstrate outstanding abilities in one or more of these areas.

Arts, Drama and Music
Newhaven College has a strong focus on the arts, with yearly school musical and drama productions, one-on-one music lessons, media and extensive creative arts.  In 2022, the new Performing Arts Wing was completed, including music lesson rooms, Technology Suite for music editing and composition, a Black Box Theatre, large Rehearsal Hall plus box office for catering and ticket sales. Director of Music, Matt Goss, oversees performing arts at the school, with 12 music tutors and teachers providing individual music tuition and class lessons.  The College also has state-of-the-art visual arts, food technology and trade centre facilities.

Sports
Newhaven College provides for a wide range of sports interests. The multi-purpose gym allows for most sports to be played all year round. The outdoor tennis courts, basketball/netball courts, plus playing fields for soccer, hockey and AFL football. The school encourages all students to participate in physical activity through PE classes and extracurricular involvement. Newhaven College participates in the SEISA sports program all year round, hosting other schools at their broad range of facilities.

Notable alumni
Liam Hemsworth-Actor 
Ricky Swallow-Sculptor
Nikki van Dijk-Surfer
Rhys Uhlich-Model

References

Private schools in Victoria (Australia)
Educational institutions established in 1980
1980 establishments in Australia